The 2015–16 CCHL season was the 55th season of the Central Canada Hockey League (CCHL). The twelve teams of the CCHL played 62-game schedules.

The winner of the Bogart Cup competed in the Eastern Canadian Junior "A" championship, the Fred Page Cup.  If successful against the winners of the Quebec Junior Hockey League and Maritime Junior A Hockey League, the champion would then move on to play in the Canadian Junior Hockey League championship, the Royal Bank Cup.

Final standings 
Note: W = Wins; L = Losses; OTL = Overtime losses; SL = Shootout losses; GF = Goals for; GA = Goals against; PTS = Points; x = clinched playoff berth; y = clinched division title; z = clinched league title.

Teams listed on the official league website.

Standings listed on official league website.

Season leaders

Scoring 
Note: GP = Games played; G = Goals; A = Assists; Pts = Points; PIM = Penalty minutes

More on scoring leaders

Goal keeping  
Note: GP = Games played; Mins = Minutes played; W = Wins; L = Losses: OTL = Overtime losses; SL = Shootout losses; GA = Goals Allowed; SO = Shutouts; GAA = Goals against average

More on goaltending leaders

Special teams

Power play 
Note: GP = Games played; PPGF = Power play goals for; ADV = Man Advantage Opportunities; PP% = Power play percentage; SHGA = Short Handed Goals Against

Penalty killing 
Note: GP = Games played; PPGA = Power play goals against; TSH = Times Short Handed; PK% = Power killing percentage; SHGF = Short Handed Goals For

More on CCHL Special Teams

Season streaks 
Wins = Carleton Place & Cumberland with 10
Losses = Kanata with 22
Home Wins = Carleton Place with 17
Home losses = Kanata with 12
Road Wins = Brockville with 6
Road losses = Kanata with 17
More on CCHL streaks

2016 Bogart Cup playoffs

Playoff results are listed on the official league website.

Fred Page Cup Championship
The 2016 edition of the Fred Page Cup was hosted by the Woodstock Slammers in Woodstock, New Brunswick.

Royal Bank Cup Championship
The Lloydminster Bobcats in Lloydminster, Alberta / Saskatchewan met the winners of the Fred page Cup, the Dudley Hewitt Cup and the Western Canada Cup in the Royal Bank Cup.

Players selected in the 2016 NHL Entry Draft
Decided at conclusion of season.

Awards
Most Valuable Player - 
Top Rookie - 
Top Graduating Player - 
Top Defenceman - 
Top Prospect - 
Top Goaltender - 
Top Coach - 
Top General Manager -

See also 
 2014 Royal Bank Cup
 2013 in ice hockey
 2014 in ice hockey

References

External links 
 Official website of the Central Hockey League
 Official website of the Canadian Junior Hockey League

CCHL
Central Canada Hockey League seasons